"Help Me Help You" is a single released by American YouTuber Logan Paul featuring American boy band Why Don't We. It was released on May 18, 2017, alongside a music video on YouTube starring Shay Mitchell.

The song debuted at number 13 on the US Bubbling Under Hot 100 Singles chart, eventually peaking at number five.

Music video
The music video was uploaded on Paul's YouTube account on May 18, 2017.

Charts

Certifications

Release history

References

2017 debut singles
2017 songs
Songs written by Candice Pillay
Logan Paul songs
Why Don't We songs

Logan Paul